The list of ship decommissionings in 1996 includes a chronological list of all ships decommissioned in 1996.


See also 

1996
 Ship decommissionings
Ship